Kasama College of Education (KACE) is a Zambian teacher training college situated in Kasama District, the provincial headquarters of Northern Province. The college is about three kilometers from the Kasama Central Business District. It is owned by the Zambian government through the Ministry of Higher Education.

History
The college was opened in 1966. Originally it was called Kasama Teachers’ Training College (KTTC) until 2000 when all government-owned teacher training colleges were renamed colleges of education. From its inception the college has had 14 principals, with only two women having served as principal. Below in the lineage of principals from its inception to date:
		 
 Gaobepe Reams 1966–1970
 Mushemi Mushemi 1970
 Aaron William Mulenga 1971–1979
 Lyton Bwalanda 1979–1986
 M. Simwinga 1986–1987
 S.W. Chanda 1987–1994
 Bruno Munyano 1994–1996
 F.L. Musonda 1996–1998
 Felix Bwalya Chanda 1998–2001
 F.J. Kapembwa 2001–2005
 M.M. Mushika 2005–2009
 E.N. Zulu (Mrs) 2009–2010
 Morris Mulundano 2010–2011
 Oscar Ntenga 2011–2012 (acting)
 Andrew T. Mutobo 2012-2016
 Florence A. Masanzi 2016–present

Courses
The college previously offered certificate courses for primary school teachers such as the Primary Teachers’ Certificate, Zambia Basic Education and the Zambia Teacher Education Course. ZATEC was the last certificate course to be offered by the college until 2012 when it was phased out.
From 2012 the college introduced the Primary Teachers’ Diploma which is a three-year diploma programme underwritten by the University of Zambia. In the same year the college introduced the Primary Teachers’ Diploma by Distance Learning, an in-service distance education programme. 
2014 has seen the introduction of Early Childhood Education programme and the Secondary Teachers’ Diploma Science and Mathematics.

References

Universities in Zambia
Buildings and structures in Kasama, Zambia